Charles Crawford Poindexter (November 20, 1898 – December 24, 1958) was an American football and basketball coach. He served as the head football coach at Western Carolina University from 1932 to 1935. Poindexter was also the head basketball coach at Western Carolina from 1932 to 1936.

A former University of North Carolina lineman, Poindexter was the head football coach at Weaver College in Weaverville, North Carolina in 1931. He died of a heart attack, on December 24, 1958, at his home in Canton, North Carolina.

References

External links
 

1898 births
1958 deaths
American football guards
Basketball coaches from North Carolina
Brevard Tornados football coaches
North Carolina Tar Heels football players
People from Macon County, North Carolina
Players of American football from North Carolina
Western Carolina Catamounts football coaches
Western Carolina Catamounts men's basketball coaches